Zoobles! (Hangul: , Katakana:) is an Anime series based on the toys of the same name by Spin Master and Sega Toys. Produced by Dong Woo Animation in Korea, the series is written by Tetsuo Yasumi, best known as the head writer of the anime adaptation of Happy Happy Clover with Japanese producer Mitsuko Ohya of Duel Masters in charge of production. Character designs in the series were done by Nam Jong-Sik of Animal Yokochō and Kazuya Hayashi of Happy Happy Clover.

The series began airing on the Korean broadcasting station Seoul Broadcasting System on May 18, 2011, to November 23, 2011. An official Japanese dubbed version aired on Japan in TV Tokyo on February 5, 2012, to March 25, 2012, replacing Bakugan Battle Brawlers: Gundalian Invaders in its initial time slot. The series re–aired on April 5, 2012, after moving to a newer time slot and ended its broadcast on September 27, 2012.

Plot
The Candy Factory is the place where all Zoobles are born. Beyond the factory is a world called Candy Land where all Zoobles live. The story revolves around three main Zoobles: Chevy, a Cat Zooble with an Orange Flavor, Coron, a Rabbit Zooble with a Strawberry Milk Flavor and Panky, a Panda Zooble with a Blueberry Yogurt Flavor. The three of them live in Candy Land, living and playing together with their friends and getting in misadventures as they learn to solve each problem they face.

Characters

Main cast

Chevy is the first main character of the series, an orange Tabby Cat Zooble with an Orange Flavor. Chevy is the best friend of both Coron and Panky, who lives in Candy Land in her flower treehouse. She has the personality of a tomboy, is slightly impudent, sometimes clumsy, impulsive, rowdy and awkward but does not like to be treated as if she were a child. Aside from her personality, Chevy can be a very cheerful and happy-go-lucky Zooble who loves a good conversation and is always seen hanging out with her friends Coron and Panky in each of their adventures. Chevy is also very athletic and enthusiastic about sports, is superb at climbing trees, and loves to read comic books. She can also be a bit of a sore loser and has serious rivalry issues with the Black Candies, especially Blacky, to the point where she wants to beat the Black Candies up or fight against them. However, when circumstances require it she and her friends will cooperate with them.

In each challenge she and her friends face, she can summon Kumanpa with a special dance.

The second main character of the series, Coron is a white and pink Rabbit Zooble with a Strawberry Milk Flavor. Coron is one of Chevy's best friends who lives in a flower house. She is a soft-spoken Romanticist, but is also known to be very kind and polite. Coron is also determined like Chevy, but not to an extent, and is not afraid to speak her own mind. She sometimes negotiates towards other Zoobles or cheers up others, not abandoning the people who are in trouble, though she can be a bit impulsive and ignorant sometimes. Coron is also very fond of milk and always carries some in her candy-like bag in case she gets thirsty or in an emergency. She is also not as active as Chevy as she is not always used to dancing.

Like Chevy and Panky, Coron can also summon Kumanpa with a special dance.

The third main character of the series, Panky is a white and purple Panda Zooble with a Blueberry Yogurt Flavor. Also one of Chevy's best friends, Panky is the only male of the group who lives in a treehouse. He is cunning, intelligent and also very timid, sometimes trying to catch up with both Chevy and Coron. His speeches end with "~damon". Unlike the other two, Panky is not as assertive as the two and sometimes can get scared when threatened, although he ends up being scolded by Chevy. Panky has limited stamina and is not as active as the two like Coron but to an extent, sometimes having trouble waking up in the morning or dancing for longer periods during practice. However, he tries to keep up with both Chevy and Coron as he does not want to let his friends down, even in situations where they are stuck with a problem. He also likes to eat bananas and is known to not be good at rock-paper-scissors.

Like Chevy and Coron, Panky can also summon Kumanpa with a special dance.

Kumanpa is a wise old Bear Zooble deity, and the king of Candy Land, on which Chevy, Coron, and Panky summon by a special dance for them to get some advice. He is very knowledgeable, moody, has a great sense of humor and is also supportive of the three protagonists. Even though his advice can be very strange, and even some of them were especially weird for the three to guess, all three figure it out eventually and it turns out that the advice helped them on their daily problems after all. He is also known to control and change the weather, usually depending on his mood. His speeches ends with "~ragu" in the Korean dub, and "~mashi" in the Japanese dub.

 Interesting fact: “Kuma” (Kanji: 熊), which is part of Kumanpa’s name, means “bear” in Japanese.

The Black Candies

The leader of the Black Candies, Black is a brown Dog Zooble with a Vanilla Caramel Flavor. Usually Chevy's rival, Blacky first met Chevy and her friends at the Rainbow Park, preventing her from taking a drink from the water fountain. He has a strong sense of responsibility on leading the group and likes to play tricks on other Zoobles. He is sometimes harsh and rough to others, especially to Chevy due to his rivalry with her, but deep underneath, he has a soft spot for others despite being a trickster. He is shown to hate Chevy after his group lost to them during a dance competition to reclaim the fountain and will do anything to totally embarrass her in public or even himself and his lackeys pick on a fight against her.

One of the members of the Black Candies, Mikey is a mint blue Dog Zooble with a Chocolate Mint Flavor. As one of Blacky's lackeys, Mikey is a big music lover, very enthusiastic on things and lastly clever. Mikey usually follows Blacky every time, scheming on plans or making fun of Chevy in some situations. He also despises Chevy a lot but sometimes is very supportive towards Blacky.

One of the members of the Black Candies and the only female of the group, Cooper is a yellow Giraffe Zooble with a Chocolate Banana Flavor. As one of Blacky's lackeys, Cooper is a calm but honest Zooble who has a fondness for dancing. She also follows Blacky every time, scheming on plans or making fun of Chevy in some situations. Unlike the other two members, she's not afraid to show her true feelings to others.

Other characters

Maron is a purple Rabbit Zooble with a Grape Flavor. She is a lovely Zooble with a nice personality but sometimes values her looks and being cute, especially on watching her weight. She often gets jealous of Coron, her look-a-like.

Em is a green and yellow Elephant Zooble with a Cream Soda Flavor. Em is a very mature Zooble with a helpful personality and also acts as Lou's babysitter. He is also very responsible to Lou every time and keeps his eyes on the young Zooble, being both a responsible parent and brother. He is also shown to have negative thoughts about rumors and chain letters.

Lou is a magenta and pink Bear Zooble with an Azuki Bean flavor. Being the only newborn in the series, Lou would usually say her name all the time until she said her first word. She also causes a lot of trouble to Em and to his friends due to her mischievousness. She is very fond of balloons, and is also known to be very emotional, as she can cry at the drop of a hat. Her appearance looks very similar to Pandera from the original western Zoobles.

Su-Su is a brown and yellow Monkey Zooble with a Pineapple Orange Flavor. Usually both a quick and mischievous Zooble, he can make anything upside down using his Zooble magic.

Peel is a red Bird Zooble with a Cherry Flavor. Peel is both a passionate and hard-working girl who likes a lot of challenges. She usually works out every time and doesn't give up on her goals. She helped Panky become more assertive.

Reel is a blue Bird Zooble with a Soda Flavor. He is a fortune teller who is good on looking at everyone's fortune using his crystal ball, though he is sometimes very friendly. His speeches usually end with "~Reel" all the time and is known to be lactose intolerant.

SunSan is a red Starfish Zooble with a Habanero flavor. SunSan is a figure skater champion in Candy Land but sometimes has a very tough personality. She is also very determined to win fair and square. However, in some situations, she can be very friendly and helpful.

Silvy is a green Tabby Cat Zooble with a Melon favor. Having a similar appearance to Chevy, she is a model who is pretty, honest and friendly. She is also very popular and sometimes surrounded by fans wherever she goes, especially Em.

Chip is a lavender-pink Seal Zooble with a Milk Crepe flavor. She has a lively personality and speaks with a Kansai dialect. Alongside Tap, they are both stand-up comedians who have a crush on Mikey and Em.

Tap is a blue Penguin Zooble with a Strawberry Cider Flavor. She is Chip's counterpart on being a stand-up comedian and also speaks with a Kansai dialect. Her appearance looks very similar to Waddles from the western Zoobles.

PuPu is a blue and green Elephant Zooble with a Blue Hawaii Flavor. Pupu is an aspiring artist who is very good at drawing and painting, though sometimes he can be dramatic and extremely nervous when something goes absolutely wrong with whatever he is painting. He has a habit on getting everyone's names wrong.

Chim is a yellow Elephant Zooble with a Ginseng flavor. Chim is the herbalist of Candy Land, who specializes in all types of herbs and spices. He is sometimes bossy, but usually reliable.

Mato is a red bird Zooble with a Tomato flavor. An expert thief, Mato is very cunning and sometimes appears and takes only things which were not needed. Since there are no clues on where she can appear, the denizens in Candy Land must be cautious of her presence. She can be a bit too straightforward and ends up kidnapping Panky in the process. She is also the announcer at many competitions across Candy Land.

Her name is based on the last two syllables of “tomato”, the fruit her flavor comes from.

Pom is a yellow and orange Mouse Zooble with a Lemon Flavor. Pom is sometimes a bit careless but is overall a nice Zooble. He usually has a bad habit of accidentally telling everyone bad things, which sometimes makes them unhappy.

Mel is a pink and blue Seahorse Zooble with a Pink Grapefruit flavor. Mel usually lives in the seas of Candy Land, usually guarding the magical Rainbow Pot. She is bright and gentle and is friends with Rin and the big fish Gonzales. Her appearance looks very similar to Kelp from the original western Zoobles albeit having a different color scheme.

Rin is a blue Fish Zooble with a Blue Hawaii Flavor. Like Mel, Rin also lives in the seas of Candy Land guarding the Rainbow Pot. She has a strong sense of justice and also is both strong and reliable. She and Mel are good friends.

Randy is a tan Koala Zooble with a Pudding flavor. Randy is somehow friendly but also anger prone. She can also get a little rough to others, especially Pom.

Harry is a pink Hedgehog Zooble with a Dragon Fruit Flavor. Harry can be very naughty sometimes, but he can also fight due to his skills at Martial Arts. His appearance looks very similar to Spikes from the original western Zoobles albeit having a different color scheme.

Panna is a cream and pale magenta Panda Zooble with a Peach Yogurt flavor who has a similar appearance to Panky. Usually polite, Panna can be very serious on things, especially those involving making girls into ideal women. Chevy always stays away from her due to Panna attempting to force her to change her tomboyish personality into a more girly one.

Alia is a magenta and green Cat Zooble with an Apple flavor. Alia likes to play various roles and loves to cosplay. In her appearances, she is dressed as a ninja to cause mischief to Chevy and her friends and later dressed as a fair lady to impress the three. Her appearance looks very similar to Pawson from the original western Zoobles albeit having a different color scheme.

Ninya is an orange Octopus Zooble with a Watermelon Flavor. Like Mel and Rin, Ninya lives in the seas of Candy land with Coco. An energetic girl, she befriended Chevy and wants her to be with her. She was chosen to be either Chip or Tap’s new partner when the comedian duo had a fight.

Coco is an orange fish Zooble with a Cola Flavor. Like the other aquatic Zoobles, Coco lives in the seas of Candy land. She is very bright and bold but also loves to have fun. She is also very open-minded. Like Ninya, she was also chosen to be either Chip or Tap’s partner.

Kimmie is a lime green Rabbit Zooble with a Kiwi flavor. Usually a gossip girl, Kimmie always finds an interesting hot topic and talks about it to her friends. She is known to tell someone's secrets all the time. She also found out about the rare blooming of the Sunset Flowers.

Winny is a red Moose Zooble with an Apple Cinnamon flavor. He is good at inventing stuff from his friends, ranging from the strange to the most useful. He is also shown to be a good pilot as well.

Loff is a blue Tabby Cat Zooble with a Plum Flavor. Loff is considered to be among the shyest of all the Zoobles, as she is almost always seen in her ball form. She doesn't always talk much, and sometimes can get scared easily. The trio wondered what her face looked like until she reveals it, having a very cute appearance. Her appearance looks very similar to Whitepaw from the original western Zoobles albeit having a different color scheme.

Ron is a white and pink striped Zebra Zooble with a Lychee flavor. Ron is very good at making Chinese cuisine and all kinds of sweets and desserts. Her speeches end with "~Rarirureron".

Coupe is a yellow and pink Giraffe Zooble with a Raspberry Cheese flavor. Somewhat a jinxed Zooble, Coope always looks on the bright side despite the huge bad luck that usually affects her and the friends around her. But sometimes her bad luck actually prevented anyone from experiencing further calamity. She is somehow carefree and very positive on things, always saying "Daijoubu~" all the time.

Q'n is a brown Monkey Zooble with a Papaya flavor. Q'n likes to play a lot but can get a bit out of hand when she does. She frequently ends her speeches with "~kyun".

Happi is a blue and pink Bat Zooble with a Mint Acreola Flavor. He is a wandering Zooble who travels all across Candy Land meeting people along his way while also finding a home. His appearance looks very similar to Dippy from the original western Zoobles albeit having a different color scheme.

Amy is a navy blue whale Zooble with a Sour Blueberry Flavor. Also living in the seas of Candy Land, Amy is sometimes a shy girl but when in a pinch, she works hard and tries to overcome her obstacles. She has a crush on another whale named Sean.

Toffy is a white bear Zooble with a Coconut Berry Flavor. Toffy is an entertainer who visits Candy Town once to perform in a play and is a master at acting. Though he can perform any role, he has a soft spot for Tosh, his crush.

Tosh is a lime green mouse Zooble with a lemon lime Flavor. Usually living in the city, Tosh is a gentle girl Zooble who sometimes likes to pretend be a princess and wishes to meet her prince. She has a deep crush on Toffy and likes to meet him as he is.

Airo is a pink giraffe Zooble with a Prune Flavor. Airo is a very playful trickster and likes to dress up as someone else. One time she dressed up as Coron after she accidentally got her Candy Bag and pretends to be her, only for her cover to be blown by Chevy and Panky.

Crew is a yellow and green Fox Zooble with a Citron Tea Flavor. Crew is very knowledgeable about things and knows to solve everyone's problem. However, Chevy and her friends overly rely on him to the point on making Kumampa jealous. He tends to say “kuru” as he rolls around in his ball form.

ToTo is a yellow Lion Zooble with a Cappuccino flavor. He is very obedient and likes to meet Kumampa in person. One time, he posed as Kumanpa.

Lily is a magenta Rabbit Zooble with a Pomegranate flavor. Lily is somehow a poet and loves to write poems, which would explain why she would usually speak in rhyme. She is also very energetic and thrilling, almost to the point of causing Chevy and her friends to find her weird sometimes.

Mill is a pink and green Bird Zooble with a Cranberry flavor. She serves as the mail carrier of Candy Land, always delivering letters and packages to any part of the land when necessary.

Arl is a green Bear Zooble with a Green Tea flavor. Arl is a very easygoing girl who enjoys tea. She is also one of the Zoobles that Chevy consulted for Chip and Tap's problem. She also likes to host tea parties.

Tam is a reddish-pink Tabby Cat Zooble with a Butter flavor. Tam admits that he is a hero of a town he visited, though no one actually saw him fight his enemies until he admitted.

Frappe is a pink Elephant Zooble with an Apricot flavor. Frappe is sometimes called the "Negative Zooble" due to her thinking anything negatively, especially love. Though she has a very dark personality, she is also very open and caring to others, especially on how she cheered Pom up.

PiPi is an orange and pink Mouse Zooble with a Peach Cheese flavor. She is very fashionable and also knows how to give other Zoobles a good makeover. PiPi is also the one who started the tail decoration craze all over Candy Land and she is very popular to everyone.

Saku is a pink cat Zooble with a Sakura flavor. She is a beginner magician and wants to get into the Magic Academy. Chevy and her friends help her on perfecting her magic skills, though the three ended up being transformed into frogs by Saku.

Her name is based on the first two syllables of sakura (Kanji: 桜), her flavor.

Potte is a pink-and-brown Reindeer Zooble with a Chocolate and Strawberry flavor. She was known to be quite timid at first, but has learned along the way to become more confident, especially when she was motivated by Chevy and her pals after she joined a screaming competition at the snow region of Candy Land.

pairing

Production

Development
Development of the anime began after the toys were released in Japan and Korea. The series itself is based on the Sega Toys adaptation of the toyline in both Japan and Korea, which differs greatly from the American version by Spin Master. Sega Toys approached Korea's Dong Woo Animation to help them make an anime series based on the toys. In turn, Dong Woo Animation and Sega assembled a group of animation staff and crew for said project. The people involved include Tetsuo Yasumi, the head writer of the anime adaptation of Happy Happy Clover, Mitsuko Ohya, director of Duel Masters in charge of production while the character designs were done by Nam Jong-Sik of Animal Yokochō and Kazuya Hayashi of Happy Happy Clover. Korean pop group Rainbow also contributed to the anime's production as they sang both the opening and ending themes.

The series began airing on the Korean broadcasting station Seoul Broadcasting System on May 18, 2011, and ended on November 23, 2011. Reruns were done by SBS from November 23, 2011, to May 16, 2012, all aired in high definition.

Japanese dub
After the series' release in Korea, it was later dubbed Japanese and 4 episodes were shown on the Japanese website for promoting the toys in Japan. Later on, the series premiered in TV Tokyo's NoriNori♪Nori Suta block, alongside Trotting Hamtaro Dechu! and Spellbound! Magical Princess Lilpri in late 2011. In January 2012, the series was announced to depart on the NoriNori♪Nori Suta block and have its official TV premiere on February 5, 2012, until March 25, 2012. The series was re–aired on April 5, 2012.

According to Mai Hirano, the airing dates of the episodes doesn't follow the standard episodic order during the dubbing of the series unlike the Korean version.

Music
Opening theme
"I Love Zoobles!"
Lyrics: Lee In-Young
Composition: Lee In-Young
Arrangement: Lee In-Young
Artist: Rainbow (DSP Media/Universal Sigma)
 Episodes: 1–8
"Candy Girls!"
Lyrics: Mai Watarai
Rapping: Emyli
Composition: Han Sang-Won, Yoon Young-Mi
Arrangement: Han Sang-Won, Yoon Young-Mi
Artist: Rainbow (Universal Sigma)
 Episodes: 9-

Ending theme

Lyrics: Lee In-Young and Yoo Seung-Hye
Composition: Lee In-Young and Yoo Seung-Hye
Arrangement: Lee In-Young and Yoo Seung-Hye
Artist: Rainbow (DSP Media/Universal Sigma)

Episodes
Notes: According to Mai Hirano, the airing dates of the episodes don't follow the standard episodic order during the dubbing of the series unlike the Korean version.

Home video
An official DVD release by Universal Japan with the first volume released on September 5, 2012, containing the first 12 episodes (24 mini-episodes each) and the music video of "Candy Girls!" done by Rainbow. A second volume was released on November 14, 2012.

References

External links
 Official SBS Website 
 Anime Website (NoriNoriNori Suta ver) 
 Anime Website (New Version) 

English-language television shows
Anime-influenced Western animated television series
Japanese children's animated adventure television series
Japanese children's animated comedy television series
Japanese children's animated fantasy television series
South Korean children's animated adventure television series
South Korean children's animated comedy television series
South Korean children's animated fantasy television series
Comedy anime and manga
Fantasy anime and manga
TV Tokyo original programming

ja:Zoobles!